The Ghana Nuclear Society (GNS) is a nonprofit organization that advocates for the introduction of nuclear energy in Ghana. It is headquartered at the Ghana Atomic Energy Commission (GAEC) in Accra. With the establishment of The Ghana Nuclear Society, Ghana has joined the league of those countries with National Nuclear Societies. Its head office is located at the Ghana Atomic Energy Commission (GAEC) in Accra. The current national president is Prof. John Justice Fletcher. The society is not for science inclined persons alone.

History

The Ghana Nuclear Society received its certificate of incorporation on 13 May 2008. The society, which operates under the motto "Nuclear for Sustainable Energy Development," has an eight-member Advisory Panel that consults with the Board of Directors, which is made up of 13 persons and four members from the National and Student Chapter Executives.

The society has created public information programs on nuclear matters, and it has produced seminars, educational outreach programs and interactive media presentations on local radio and television stations. It also publishes a newsletter that outlines issues relating to nuclear energy.

It is planning educational programs at the SAMBEL Academy and the GAEC, and at primary schools located near the Graduate School of Nuclear and Allied Sciences at Atomic, Kwabeyna.

Notable milestones

2008 - First and Second Newsletter
2008 - First Annual General Meeting
2009 - Third Newsletter
2009 - Workshop on Human Resource Development for a nuclear power program.
2009 - Public Lecture on the theme ”The Role of Nuclear Power in attaining middle income status”.
2009 - Educational Outreach Programs for Schools.
2009 – Second Annual General 
2010 - planning for the 2010 Energy Security for Africa.

Society members

2010 African Conference

To enhance public acceptance and awareness of the Nuclear Power Option, the society organized a three-day conference under the theme: “Energy Security for Accelerated Development of the African Region”. This conference hoped to promote the acceptance of the Nuclear Power in Africa by bringing together nuclear power vendors, reactor manufactures, scientists and experts in the field to share knowledge with those in Africa.

See also

Nuclear energy in Ghana
Ghana Atomic Energy Commission

References

Nuclear organizations
Non-profit organisations based in Ghana
Nuclear power in Ghana